Darren Ronan (born 4 November 1976) is an Irish hurler who played for the Cork senior team.

Born in Ballyhea, County Cork, Ronan first played competitive hurling whilst at school at Charleville CBS. He arrived on the inter-county scene at the age of seventeen when he first linked up with the Cork minor team, before later joining the under-21 side. He made his senior debut during the 1995 championship.

At club level Ronan has won several divisional championship medals with Ballyhea.

His brother, Neil, is a two-time All-Ireland medallist with Cork.

Ronan left the Cork panel after the 1997 championship.

Honours

Team

Cork
All-Ireland Under-21 Hurling Championship (1): 1997
Munster Under-21 Hurling Championship (3): 1996, 1997
Munster Minor Hurling Championship (1): 1994

References

1976 births
Living people
Ballyhea hurlers
Cork inter-county hurlers